The 1943 Tulsa Golden Hurricane team represented the University of Tulsa during the 1943 college football season. In their third year under head coach Henry Frnka, the Golden Hurricane compiled a 6–0–1 record in the regular season, including lopsided victories over SMU (20-7), Texas Tech (34-7), Oklahoma (20-6), Utah (55-0), Oklahoma State (55-6), and Arkansas (61-0). They lost to Georgia Tech, 20-18, in the 1944 Sugar Bowl.

Schedule

Rankings

The AP released their first poll on October 4. The Golden Hurricane made their first appearance as a ranked team on October 25.

References

Tulsa
Tulsa Golden Hurricane football seasons
Missouri Valley Conference football champion seasons
Tulsa Golden Hurricane football